Intracorporeal or intracorporal is an adjective that means within (intra-) the body (corpus). Its antonym is extracorporeal.

It is used frequently in medicine to describe medical procedures that occur within the body, or within a corpus, as opposed to extracorporeal procedures (e.g. extracorporeal membrane oxygenation).

In a medical or surgical context, it may refer to:

 Intracorporeal anastomosis
 Intracorporeal circulation
 Intracorporeal energy harvesting, harvesting energy from the body, and storing it, to sustain a medical device (e.g. a pacemaker).
 Intracorporeal injection
 Intracorporeal microrobotics
 Intracorporeal reconstruction
 Intracorporeal suturing
 Intracorporeal urinary diversion
 Lithotripsy:
 Intracorporeal electrohydraulic lithotripsy
 Intracorporeal laser lithotripsy
 Intracorporeal pneumatic lithotripsy
 Intracorporeal shock wave lithotripsy

See also 
 
 
 Human body (corpus humanum)
 In vivo

References 

Medical terminology